The Lord Lonsdale Challenge Belt, commonly known as the Lonsdale Belt, is the oldest championship belt in British professional boxing. Hugh Lowther, 5th Earl of Lonsdale, introduced the prize on behalf of the National Sporting Club (NSC), intending it to be awarded to British boxing champions. Arthur Frederick Bettinson, manager of the NSC, introduced terms and conditions regarding the holding of the belt, which ensured its lasting prestige. Freddie Welsh earned the first Lonsdale Belt in 1909 after winning the NSC British Lightweight title. Heavyweight Henry Cooper was the first and only boxer to win three Lonsdale Belts. In 1929 the British Boxing Board of Control (BBBofC) assumed responsibility for awarding the belt, which continues to be bestowed on British champions.

Only six boxers have won two Lonsdale belts each outright since 1934, which led to the BBBofC introducing more stringent rules of attainment in the 1980s and 1990s. The last winner of two belts was Clinton McKenzie in 1987. The Lonsdale belt is a coveted prize with great monetary and sentimental value, finding homes in private collections and museums, and has been auctioned for large sums of money. Belts have been stolen on numerous occasions, none of which have ever been found. Since 1909, only 161 boxers have won a Lonsdale belt outright across all weights. In 2013 the BBBofC in a move to acknowledge further the esteem held for outright Lonsdale belt winners introduced the Lonsdale Badge. Outright winners of the belt are now entitled to display this badge on their boxing shorts during bouts.

History

1909–1936: National Sporting Club 
Lord Lonsdale was the first president of the National Sporting Club (NSC). In 1909, he introduced the Lonsdale Belt—originally the Challenge Belt—as a new trophy for British boxing champions in each weight division. A 9-carat or 22-carat gold belt composed of two heavy chains with a central enamel medallion depicting a boxing match, the centrepiece is flanked by enamel medallions showing single boxers and gold medallions with a scroll on which is inscribed the names of belt winners. The medallions are interspersed with smaller gold medallions depicting the Union Rose. The belts are backed with a red, white and blue ribbon. The first belts were made in the Birmingham workshop of jewellers Mappin & Webb The silversmiths and trophy makers Thomas Fattorini Ltd, were commissioned to make the belts in sterling silver in the early 1970s and have been making them since. The manufacturer and the date a belt was manufactured can be identified by the hallmark on the parts. Each portrait of Lord Lonsdale is uniquely hand painted in vitreous enamel. 
A total of 22 Lonsdale belts were issued by the NSC; 20 were won outright.

The manager of the NSC Arthur Frederick Bettinson published details about the terms and conditions of holding the belt agreed by the NSC in Sporting Life on 22 December 1909. The main rules were:
 The holder was required to defend his title within six months of a challenge. Minimum stake of  a side (£200 for heavyweights, £50 for flyweights)
 The belt became the holder's property after three successful bouts held under the auspices of the NSC, consecutive or otherwise, or after it was held for three consecutive years. Outright winners would also receive an NSC pension of £50 a year from the age of 50.
 The holder was required to pay a deposit and insurance for the belt.

The first recipient of this belt was Freddie Welsh, who defeated Johnny Summers on 8 November 1909 for the NSC British Lightweight title.

1936–present: British Boxing Board of Control 

The NSC became virtually defunct in 1929 and lost control of the sport to the British Boxing Board of Control (BBBofC), which started to issue the Lord Lonsdale Challenge Belt in 1936. Lonsdale consented to the use of his name and image on the belt in perpetuity; an image of his face remains on it. In 1939 the last 9-carat gold belt was launched by the BBBofC and won by the lightweight Eric Boon that year. The last 9-carat gold belt was won outright by Henry Cooper in 1959. Belts made from 1945 are composed of hallmarked silver and the laurel-leaf border has the thistle, daffodil and shamrock added to the extant rose to represent the four national flowers of the UK. The belt was machine-made for a short time in the 1970s before the BBBofC decided to have it hand-made again, passing the contract to Thomas Fattorini Ltd, who continue to make the belts . Each belt costs £14,000.

Changes 
In 1987, the BBBofC decided to award only one belt to any boxer in each division. A boxer can, however, win belts outright in different weight classes.

On 1 September 1999 the BBBofC changed the criteria for winning a belt outright; boxers must now win four—rather than three—championship contests in the same weight division. The rule also stipulates that one of the four wins must be a mandatory contest. The BBBofC general secretary John Morris cited the rising costs of making the belts as the chief reason for the rule change.

The BBBofC introduced the Lonsdale Badge in 2013; it is worn by outright winners. According to a Eurosport report:

Donations and auctions 
The Lonsdale belt won by Bombardier Billy Wells in 1911 is now kept at the Royal Artillery Barracks in Woolwich, London, and is not on display to the general public. Johnny Brown's Lonsdale Belt was donated to the Museum of London in 2010. In November 2000 the belt awarded to Randy Turpin in 1956 was auctioned for £23,000 while in September 2011, the belt won by the welterweight Jack Hood in 1926 fetched £36,000. Hood, who died in 1992, had displayed his belt above the bar at the Bell public house, of which he was the licensee, in Tanworth-in-Arden .

In 1993, Henry Cooper sold all three of his belts for £42,000 after losing heavily on the Lloyd's insurance market. One of the belts—the last one made of gold—was sold for £22,000. The others sold for £10,000 each. Cooper was expecting £70,000 for the sale but was content they were all sold together.

Theft 
The belts have attracted targeted theft over the years. The first recorded in the media was Don Cockell's Lonsdale belt, which was stolen in 1952 from a glass cabinet at his home in London while he was out dancing. He did not own the £15,000 belt at the time, needing one more victory. In 2007, after attending a training camp, Bobby Vanzie returned to his home to Bradford and discovered his belt had been stolen. Tara promoter Jack Doughty said in the Manchester Evening News: "This is the best belt a boxer can win. It is better than those for world title fights, gold plated with a portrait of Lord Lonsdale in the middle."

Pat McAteer's belt was stolen from his son's home at Annapolis, Maryland, in 2012.  The boxer's son, also named Pat, told the Liverpool Echo that since his father's death he has only had the belt out once to show his nine-year-old nephew Will. "Will was like ‘wow’ when he saw ‘Pop Pop’s’ belt. He was going to inherit the belt from me and he was to pass it to his son and so on, so it would stay in the McAteer family." Jack Petersen's Lonsdale belt was stolen from his son's home in Burnham, Buckinghamshire in 2013.  His son Robert, managing director of Cardiff PR firm Petersens, told Wales Online: "It’s the  family’s crown jewels, a magnificent looking piece of art. It would be a terrible shame if it was melted down."

Current holders of the BBBofC Lonsdale Belt

Outright winners of Lonsdale belt

Key

See also 

 Evolution of professional boxing

Bibliography 
 
 Golesworthy, Maurice (1988). Encyclopaedia of Boxing (Eighth Edition), Robert Hale Limited,

References

Video

External links 
 "Boxrec.com – Lonsdale Belt article"
 "Bbc.co.uk – Lonsdale Belt article"
 

Boxing awards
Boxing in the United Kingdom
Awards established in 1909
1909 establishments in the United Kingdom
History of boxing
Boxing competitions in the United Kingdom
Professional boxing organizations